Jordan James Schafer (born September 4, 1986) is a former American professional baseball  center fielder. He played in Major League Baseball (MLB) for the Atlanta Braves, Houston Astros and Minnesota Twins as a center fielder.

Baseball career

Atlanta Braves
Schafer was drafted by the Atlanta Braves in the third round of the 2005 Major League Baseball Draft out of Winter Haven High School. In April  he was suspended 50 games by Major League Baseball after being accused of HGH use. He was the first player to be suspended by Major League Baseball's Department of Investigations.

Schafer was named the Braves' starting center fielder for the 2009 season on April 3, 2009, despite never having played at a higher level than Double-A. He made his major league debut on April 5, 2009, becoming the 99th player in Major League Baseball history to hit his first career home run in his first major league at bat, off Brett Myers of the Philadelphia Phillies. He finished the game 2 for 3, with the home run, a single, an intentional walk, and a strikeout.

On June 2, 2009, Schafer was optioned to Triple-A Gwinnett Braves after batting only .204 with 63 strikeouts in 167 at-bats. He was called back up to the major league team on May 24, 2011.

Houston Astros

On July 31, 2011, Schafer was traded with Juan Abreu, Paul Clemens, and Brett Oberholtzer to the Houston Astros in exchange for Michael Bourn.

On April 29, 2012, Schafer was ejected from a game by umpire Marvin Hudson after disputing an out call on an attempted steal.

Second stint with Braves
On November 1, 2012, the Atlanta Braves reacquired Jordan Schafer from the Houston Astros on waivers. Schafer was placed on the disabled list on July 4, 2013, with a stress fracture in his ankle. He was designated for assignment by the Braves on August 1, 2014.

Minnesota Twins 

Schafer was claimed off waivers by the Minnesota Twins on August 3, 2014. He was named the Twins' 2015 Opening Day center fielder. The team released him on June 18 to make room for an influx of outfield prospects.

Los Angeles Dodgers
Schafer signed a minor league contract with the Los Angeles Dodgers on January 13, 2016. The Dodgers converted him to a pitcher and assigned him to the Double-A Tulsa Drillers of the Texas League. He performed well enough that he was selected to participate in the mid-season Texas League All-Star Game. He pitched in 31 games for Tulsa, six for the Triple-A Oklahoma City Dodgers and another three for the Arizona League Dodgers. Overall, he was 1–1 with a 4.93 ERA in 49  innings.

St. Louis Cardinals
On December 12, 2016, he signed a minor league contract with the St. Louis Cardinals. He joined the team for spring training, during which, on March 14, 2017, it was announced that Schafer would undergo surgery on his left elbow. He missed the entire season.

Invited to spring training in 2018, he was among six cut to minor-league camp on March 4. He was released on March 12.

San Francisco Giants
On April 3, 2018, Schafer signed a minor league contract with the San Francisco Giants. He was released on June 9, 2018.

See also

 List of players with a home run in first major league at-bat

References

External links

1986 births
Living people
American people of German descent
American sportspeople in doping cases
Arizona League Dodgers players
Atlanta Braves players
Baseball pitchers
Baseball players from Indiana
Gulf Coast Astros players
Gulf Coast Braves players
Gulf Coast Cardinals players
Gwinnett Braves players
Houston Astros players
Major League Baseball center fielders
Mayos de Navojoa players
American expatriate baseball players in Mexico
Memphis Redbirds players
Minnesota Twins players
Mississippi Braves players
Myrtle Beach Pelicans players
Oklahoma City Dodgers players
Oklahoma City RedHawks players
Peoria Javelinas players
Rome Braves players
Sacramento River Cats players
Sportspeople from Hammond, Indiana
Sportspeople from Winter Haven, Florida
Tulsa Drillers players